Zeydabad (also Romanized as Zeydābād and Zeid Abad; also known as Javādīyeh-ye Zeydābād) is a village in Borj-e Akram Rural District, in the Central District of Fahraj County, Kerman Province, Iran. At the 2006 census, its population was 489, in 123 families.

References 

Populated places in Fahraj County